The following lists events that happened during 1869 in Chile.

Incumbents
President of Chile: José Joaquín Pérez

Events

Births
29 August - Alberto Valenzuela Llanos (d. 1925)

Deaths
14 July - Isidora Zegers (b. 1803)

References 

 
1860s in Chile
Chile
Chile
Years of the 19th century in Chile